The Mid Ulster Film Festival is an international film festival, established in 2004 by Mary Mullin and Roisin Nevin. Hugh Mullin and Geoffrey Sproule, film co-ordinator and technician, joined in 2005. The festival was cancelled in 2010 due to a lack of funding needed to run event.

2009 Festival
The 6th Annual Mid Ulster Film Festival took place on 1–3 May 2009. In all, over 80 films were shown over the course of the weekend.

To accommodate these showings there was a total of four studios, three studios inside the main building at The Ulster History Park, and  The Cinemobile, a large custom-made truck housing a complete cinema with capacity for over 100 people.

2007 and 2008 festivals
In 2008, the Film Festival was held in An Creagán Visitor Centre near Omagh on 2–4 May 2008 and included feature films and over 50 short films, including John, I'm Sorry, foreign-language films, documentaries, workshops and seminars. The Fourth festival also took place in An Creagán, on 4–6 May 2007, with the European premiere of Proud to open the festival. It included The Last King of Scotland and closed with a showing of Bobby.

2010 Film Festival
The 2010 Mid Ulster Film Festival was scheduled for 7–9 May 2010. but was cancelled due to lack of funding.

References

External links
Mid Ulster Film Festival website

Film festivals in Northern Ireland
County Tyrone
2004 establishments in Northern Ireland
Spring (season) events in Northern Ireland
Defunct film festivals in the United Kingdom